Houston Summit were a professional indoor soccer team that operated from 1978 to 1980. They played in the original Major Indoor Soccer League. In 1980, the franchise was moved to Baltimore to become the Baltimore Blast. Their roster mainly included players from the Houston NASL, the Houston Hurricane. During the two seasons that the Summit played in Houston, the average home attendance was 2,749.  The team was named for its home arena.

Season-by-Season

Honors

MISL Championships
 runner-up: (1979–80)

MISL Regular Season Prmiereships
 (1978–79)

MISL Division Championships
 Central Division: (1979–80)

MISL Coach Of The Year
 Timo Liekoski (1978–79)

MISL Goalkeeper of the Year
 Paul Hammond (1978–79)
 Sepp Gantenhammer (1979–80)

MISL Leading Goalkeeper
 Paul Hammond (1978–79)
 Sepp Gantenhammer (1979–80)

All-MISL: First Team
 Kai Haaskivi (1978–79, 1979–80)
 Ian Anderson (1978–79)

All-MISL: Second Team
 Paul Hammond (1978–79)
 Stewart Jump (1978–79)

All-MISL: Honorable Mention
 Mick Poole (1979–80)
 Jim Pollihan (1979–80)

MISL All-Star Game Selections: First Team
 Mick Poole (1979–80)
 Ian Anderson (1979–80)
 Kai Haaskivi (1979–80)

MISL All-Star Game Selections: Second Team
 Stewart Jump (1979–80)
 John Stremlau (1979–80)

References

 
Defunct indoor soccer clubs in the United States
Summit
Defunct soccer clubs in Texas
1978 establishments in Texas
1980 disestablishments in Texas
Association football clubs established in 1978
Association football clubs disestablished in 1980